The 1981 Southeast Asian Games, officially known as the 11th Southeast Asian Games, was a multi-sport event held in Manila, Philippines from 6 to 15 December 1981. This was the first time that the Philippines hosted the Games since its first participation in 1977, and by that, the Philippines became the sixth nation to host the SEA Games after Thailand, Burma, Malaysia, Singapore and Indonesia.

More than 2,200 athletes and officials had participated in the Manila SEA Games. The event was officially opened by President Ferdinand Marcos, and the cauldron was lit by Benjamin Silva-Netto. The colourful opening ceremony was held in the Rizal Memorial Stadium.

A new football stadium and indoor arena was built in Pasig named the University of Life Track & Field and Arena or the ULTRA, now called the PhilSports Complex. The adjacent apartments were used as the athlete's quarters and was converted into a BLISS housing project of First Lady Imelda Marcos. The final medal tally was led by Indonesia, followed by Thailand and hosts Philippines.

The games

Participating nations
Brunei was a British colony at that time

Sports

Medal table

Key

References

 Percy Seneviratne (1993) Golden Moments: the S.E.A Games 1959-1991 Dominie Press, Singapore 
 History of the SEA Games

 
Southeast Asian Games
1981 in Asian sport
Southeast Asian Games, 1981
Southeast Asian Games
Sports in Manila
Multi-sport events in the Philippines
Southeast Asian Games
20th century in Manila
Southeast Asian Games